Boost, boosted or boosting may refer to:

Science, technology  and mathematics
 Boost, positive manifold pressure in turbocharged engines
 Boost (C++ libraries), a set of free peer-reviewed portable C++ libraries
 Boost (material), a material branded and used by Adidas in the midsoles of shoes.
 Boost, a loose term for turbo or supercharger
 Boost converter, an electrical circuit variation of a DC to DC converter, which increases (boosts) the voltage
 Boosted fission weapon,  a type of nuclear bomb that uses a small amount of fusion fuel to increase the rate, and thus yield, of a fission reaction
 Boosting (machine learning), a supervised learning algorithm
 Intel Turbo Boost, a technology that enables a processor to run above its base operating frequency
 Jump start (vehicle), to start a vehicle 
 Lorentz boost, a type of Lorentz transformation

Arts, entertainment, and media

Fictional characters
 Boost (Cars), a character from the Pixar franchise Cars
 Boost (comics), a character from Marvel Comics

Films
 Boost (film), a 2017 Canadian film directed by Darren Curtis
 The Boost, a 1988 drama film directed by Harold Becker

Brands and enterprises
 Boost (chocolate bar), a chocolate bar produced by Cadbury
 Boost (drink), nutritional drinks brand made by Nestlé
 Boost Energy is the Pay As You Go brand of OVO Energy
 Boost!, American non-carbonated cola brand
 Boost Drinks, British drinks company
 Boost ETP, British independent boutique Exchange Traded Products provider
 Boost Juice, a company in Australia
 Boost Mobile (disambiguation), a brand of mobile phone services in Australia and the United States
 Boosted (company), a defunct American manufacturer of electric skateboards
 Lego Boost, a robotics Lego theme

Other uses
 Boost, a slang term meaning steal or shoplift
 Boosting (doping), a form of doping used by athletes with a spinal cord injury

See also
 Booster (disambiguation)